Chill'em All is the debut album by Canadian electronic musician Champion, released in 2004 on Saboteur Records.

A 32-second cut of "No Heaven" serves as the opening theme for the 2009 Canadian TV series The Line. "No Heaven" was also used in a trailer for the First-person shooter/Role-playing game Borderlands, in addition to playing over the game's end credits. Also featured in the endings of the video game Army of Two.

Track listing

Certifications

References

2004 debut albums
DJ Champion albums